Andrei Erdely (born 2 June 1955) is a Romanian speed skater. He competed in two events at the 1980 Winter Olympics.

References

1955 births
Living people
Romanian male speed skaters
Olympic speed skaters of Romania
Speed skaters at the 1980 Winter Olympics
Sportspeople from Cluj-Napoca